The Kent Cricket League is the top level of competition for recreational club cricket in Kent, England.

The league was founded in 1970 and the first season of play was 1971.  The twelve founding clubs were Ashford, Aylesford Paper Mills, Dartford, Dover, Folkestone, Gore Court, Gravesend, Holmesdale, The Mote, St Lawrence and Highland Court, Sevenoaks Vine, and Tunbridge Wells.

Beckenham, Blackheath, and Bromley joined the league before the 1973 season. Aylesford Paper Mills left after the 1976 season but were replaced by Forest Hill, and then Bexley joined for the 1978 season. Forest Hill closed down in 1980, but Hayes (Kent) and Midland Bank (now New Beckenham) joined in 1982 to bring the number of clubs in the league up to seventeen.

A major change took place before the 1996 season, when the league absorbed the East Kent Cricket League and the South Thames Cricket League. A new structure with three divisions was introduced, and for the first time there was promotion and relegation.

From 1999 the Kent League was a designated ECB Premier League. From 1999 to 2002, the league experimented with matches played over two days on consecutive Saturdays and was the only ECB Premier League to do this, but it reverted to one day cricket in time for the 2003 season.

Until the 2019 season the Kent League had six divisions each containing ten clubs, and below these six divisions lay the Kent Regional Cricket League. The teams competing in the Premier Division in 2020 were due to be Beckenham, Bexley, Bickley Park, Blackheath, Bromley, Holmesdale, Lordswood, Sandwich Town, Sevenoaks Vine, and Tunbridge Wells. The 2020 competition was cancelled because of the COVID-19 pandemic, and the Kent Cricket League was the only ECB Premier League in England which chose not to organise any kind of replacement competition for the later part of the season when cricket again became possible. Normal service was resumed when a full season of competitive matches was held in 2021.

Champions

Premier 1st XI Performance by season from 1999

References

External links
 Kent Cricket League - Official play-cricket website

English domestic cricket competitions
Cricket in Kent
ECB Premier Leagues